Frank Walter Stanley (May 5, 1922 – December 21, 1999) was an American cinematographer. He is best known for four Clint Eastwood films in a row: Breezy (1973), Magnum Force (1973), Thunderbolt and Lightfoot (1974) and The Eiger Sanction (1975). During the filming of The Eiger Sanction, shot in Switzerland, which required a great deal of precarious mountain-climbing cinematography,
Stanley fell during the shoot but survived. He used a wheelchair for some time and was taken out of action. Stanley, who later managed to complete filming after a delay under pressure from an unsympathetic Clint Eastwood, would later blame Eastwood for the accident due to a lack of preparation, describing him both as a director and an actor as  "a very impatient man who doesn't really plan his pictures or do any homework. He figures he can go right in and sail through these things". Stanley was never hired by Eastwood or Malpaso Productions again. Bruce Surtees was Eastwood's regular cinematographer before and after this period, on a total of twelve films.

Later Stanley was the cinematographer on Blake Edwards's 10 (1979) and Grease 2 (1982).

References

Bibliography

External links

American cinematographers
1922 births
1999 deaths
Artists from New York City
Burials at Florida National Cemetery